Qashqai or Qashqay may refer to:

Qashqai people
Qashqai language
Nissan Qashqai, a compact crossover SUV
Hoseynabad-e Qashqai, village in Tehran Province, Iran
Qashqay (village), a village in East Azerbaijan Province, Iran

People with the surname
Mirali Qashqai (1907–1977), Azerbaijani geologist